Down is an album by the Chicago band The Jesus Lizard. It was their last album for Touch and Go records and the last to be produced by Steve Albini.

The song "Horse" was labeled as "Pony Beat" on set lists for live shows. David Wm. Sims plays an organ on the album version.

A video was created for the song "Destroy Before Reading," featuring David Yow as simply a head in laboratory.

The painting on the cover is "Falling Dog" by Malcolm Bucknall, for which Bucknall asked no pay and offers no explanation. Bucknall also did the cover art for the Puss/Oh, the Guilt split single with Nirvana and the Jesus Lizard's Liar album.

Track listing

Chart performance

References

External links
 - Steve Albini discusses getting fired by the band in the comments below the review.

1994 albums
The Jesus Lizard albums
Albums produced by Steve Albini
Touch and Go Records albums